Maurice Blocker (born May 15, 1963) is an American former professional boxer who competed from 1982 to 1995. He was a two-time welterweight world champion, having held the WBC title from 1990 to 1991, and the IBF title from 1991 to 1992. He also challenged for the WBC super welterweight title in 1993.

Professional boxing career

Blocker became a professional boxer in 1982. He lost his first opportunity to win a title in 1987 to Lloyd Honeyghan. In 1990 he captured the lineal and WBC welterweight titles from Marlon Starling, but lost them during his next fight to Simon Brown. In 1991 he defeated Glenwood Brown to capture the vacant IBF welterweight title. He defended the title successfully once and in 1993 moved up a weight class to fight Terry Norris for the WBC light middleweight title. He was TKO'd, and later that year took on Félix Trinidad to defend his IBF welterweight title but was KO'd in the 2nd. He retired in 1995.

His record was 36-4 with 20 knockouts.

Professional boxing record

See also 
List of welterweight boxing champions
List of WBC world champions
List of IBF world champions

References

External links 
 

|-

|-

1963 births
Living people
African-American boxers
Boxers from Washington, D.C.
Light-middleweight boxers
Welterweight boxers
World welterweight boxing champions
American male boxers
21st-century African-American people
20th-century African-American sportspeople